Jeunesse Athlétique du Cotonou is a football club in Benin, playing in the town of Cotonou. They play in the Beninese first division, the Benin Premier League.

The club were previously known as Jeunesse Athlétique du Plateau and played in Pobè, a city in the Plateau Department of Benin.

Stadium
Currently the team plays at the 5,000 capacity Stade Jean-Pierre Gascon.

Honours

Domestic
 Benin Premier League
 Champions (1): 2012–13

References

External links
Soccerway

Football clubs in Benin